The 2017 IIHF World Championship Division III was an international ice hockey tournament run by the International Ice Hockey Federation. It was contested in Sofia, Bulgaria from 10 to 16 April 2017. Seven teams participated in the tournament, divided into two groups. Bosnia and Herzegovina was originally scheduled to participate, but withdrew before the tournament began; all their games were recorded as 5–0 forfeits for the opposing team. Luxembourg won the tournament, defeating Bulgaria 10–4 in the final, and played in Division IIB in 2018. Chinese Taipei debuted in Division III and, apart from defeating Bosnia and Herzegovina in a forfeit, recorded their first official win, beating the UAE 4–0 in the 5th place playoff.

Venues

The Bulgarian bid was the only contender for the 2017 IIHF World Championship Division III competition. It will mark the first time that this competition has been held in Bulgaria. In September 2016 the format of the division was realigned into one tournament with two preliminary divisions.

Participants

Match officials
5 referees and 9 linesmen were selected for the tournament.

Referees
 Michał Baca
 Miha Bajt
 Ivan Fateyev
 Cemal Ersin Kaya
 Kim No-su

Linesmen
 Ferhat Aygün
 Christian Cristeli
 Illya Khokhlov
 Aleh Kliashcheunikau
 Jonas Merten
 Jakob Schauer
 Luchezar Stoyanov
 Gil Haim Tichon
 Wiktor Zień

Preliminary round
All times are local (UTC+3).

Group A

Group B

Knockout stage

Bracket

5th place bracket

5th–7th place semifinal

Semifinals

Fifth place game

Third place game

Final

Final ranking

(H) Host; (P) Promoted; (R) Relegated.Source: IIHF.com

Awards and statistics

Awards

Best players selected by the directorate:
 Best Goaltender:  Liao Yu-cheng
 Best Defenceman:  Artem Kurbatov
 Best Forward:  Robert Beran
Source: IIHF.com

Scoring leaders

GP = Games played; G = Goals; A = Assists; Pts = Points; +/− = Plus/minus; PIM = Penalties in minutes; POS = Position
Source: IIHF.com

Goaltending leaders
Only the top five goaltenders, based on save percentage, who have played at least 40% of their team's minutes, are included in this list.

TOI = Time on ice (minutes:seconds); SA = Shots against; GA = Goals against; GAA = Goals against average; Sv% = Save percentage; SO = Shutouts
Source: IIHF.com

References

2017
Division III
2017 IIHF World Championship Division III
2017 IIHF World Championship Division III
2010s in Sofia
World